US Post Office-Cortland is a historic post office building located at Cortland in Cortland County, New York.  It was built in 1913-1915 and enlarged in 1940–1941.  It is one of a number of post offices in New York State designed by the Office of the Supervising Architect of the Treasury Department, Oscar Wenderoth. It is a one-story building with a brick foundation clad in granite with facades clad in coursed ashlar limestone in the Neoclassical style.  The lobby features a wood relief by Ryah Ludins in 1942-1943 titled "Valley of the Seven Hills." 

It was listed on the National Register of Historic Places in 1988.

References

External links

Cortland
Government buildings completed in 1915
Neoclassical architecture in New York (state)
Buildings and structures in Cortland County, New York
National Register of Historic Places in Cortland County, New York